Justin Jamaal Ellis (born December 27, 1990) is an American football nose tackle for the New York Giants of the National Football League (NFL). He was drafted by the Oakland Raiders in the fourth round of the 2014 NFL Draft. He played college football at Louisiana Tech.

High school
Ellis attended Neville High School in Monroe, Louisiana, where he was a two-time first-team all-District 2-4A selection.  He was named first-team all-state by the LSWA as a senior, and was a two-time all-Northeast Louisiana selection by the Monroe News-Star.  Ellis also lettered three years in track & field, competing in the shot put, where he finished third in the state as a junior, the javelin throw (top-throw of 47.2 meters) and the discus throw, where he captured the state title with a throw of 47.15 meters in 2009.

He was rated a two-star recruit by Rivals.com.

College career
Ellis attended Louisiana Tech University from 2009 to 2013. He redshirted as a true freshman in 2009. In 2010, Ellis played in four games and recorded three tackles. In 2011, he was a second-team All-WAC selection after appearing in all 13 games, recording 20 tackles, 3.5 for loss, one sack and one fumble recovery. In 2012, he recorded 21 total tackles with two forced fumbles. In 2013, he recorded a career high 48 tackles, and set career bests In tackles for loss with 5.5, and sacks with 1.5, earning himself conference honorable mention honors.

Professional career

2014 NFL Draft

Oakland Raiders
Ellis was drafted by the Oakland Raiders in the fourth round (107th overall) of the 2014 NFL Draft.

On March 9, 2018, Ellis signed a three-year $15 million contract extension with the Raiders.

On September 13, 2018, Ellis was placed on injured reserve after suffering a foot injury in Week 1. He was activated off injured reserve on December 1, 2018.

On August 31, 2019, Ellis was placed on injured reserve. He was released on October 8, 2019.

Baltimore Ravens
On November 12, 2019, Ellis was signed by the Baltimore Ravens.

On March 21, 2020, Ellis re-signed with the Ravens.

On March 5, 2021, Ellis signed a one-year contract extension with the Ravens. He was released on August 31, 2021, and re-signed to the practice squad the next day. He was promoted to the active roster on September 15, 2021.

New York Giants
On March 23, 2022, the New York Giants signed Ellis to a one-year contract.

NFL career statistics

References

External links
Oakland Raiders bio
Louisiana Tech Bulldogs bio

Living people
1990 births
Sportspeople from Monroe, Louisiana
Players of American football from Louisiana
American football defensive tackles
Louisiana Tech Bulldogs football players
Oakland Raiders players
Baltimore Ravens players
New York Giants players